Persatuan Sepakbola Denpasar, commonly known as Perseden Denpasar is an Indonesian football club located in Denpasar, Bali. The team competes in Liga 3, the lowest tier of the Indonesian football league system.

History 
Perseden in 1991 competed in the Second Division of Perserikatan where they won by beating PSBL Bandar Lampung 1–0 in the final. After Perserikatan and Galatama were merged into Liga Indonesia, their best achievement was reaching the last four in the 1996–97 First Division season.

However, it was only in the 2003 season that they competed at the highest level of Indonesian football for the first time after being runner-up in the 2002 First Division season. Only a season competed in the Premier Division, they must be relegated again after failed in the relegation play-offs.

At the end of 2016, Perseden won the 2016 ISC Liga Nusantara, an unofficial Liga Nusantara season due to FIFA suspension, after beating PSN 2–0 in the final.

Stadium 
Perseden plays their home matches at Kompyang Sujana Stadium, Denpasar. They often plays their home matches at Ngurah Rai Stadium, Denpasar.

Supporters 
Laskar Catur Muka is the name of the supporters of Perseden Denpasar.

Honours 
 Perserikatan Second Division:
 Winners (1): 1991–92
 Liga Indonesia First Division:
 Runners-up (1): 2002
 ISC Liga Nusantara
 Winners (1): 2016
 Liga 3 Bali:
 Winners (3): 2019, 2021, 2022
 Runners-up (2): 2017, 2018

References

External links 
 

 
Perseden Denpasar
Perseden Denpasar
Perseden Denpasar
Perseden Denpasar